The Range is a rural locality, south of Adelaide, South Australia. The Range Post Office opened on 1 June 1947 and closed in 1962.

References

Suburbs of Adelaide